This list covers the many types of dhampirs or dhampir-like creatures found in fiction. It does not include any dhampir that originates in folklore or mythology, nor does it include the concept of 'full' vampires.

Literary

 AJ Ashe (Bite Me)
 Alberta Petrov (Vampire Academy series)
 Alexa Charon (Changeling)
 Ana Parker  (Vampire Princess of St. Paul series) 
 Angelica Cross (Stake-out)
 Angeline Dawes (Vampire Academy series)
 Ariella Montero  (Ethical Vampire series)
 Astrid Sonnschein (Fifty Percent Vampire)
 Blade (Eric Brooks) (Blade comics and Blade films)
 Bruno (Bruno Dhampiro)
 Caine Griffith (Dhampir)
 Catherine "Cat" Crawfield (Night Huntress)
 Celeste (Vampire Academy series)
 Christophe Reynard (Strange Angels)
 Connor (Angel)
 Connor Tempest (Vampirates series)
 D (Vampire Hunter D)
 Darius Shan (The Saga of Darren Shan)
 Darren Shan (The Saga of Darren Shan)
 Dimitri Belikov (Vampire Academy series)
 Dru Anderson (Strange Angels)
 Dorina Basarab (Midnight's Daughter)
 Dawn Montgomery ( Darkness Before Dawn) 
 Edison 'Eddie' Castile (Vampire Academy series)
 Erik Phillip James Karter (The Protectors: Book 6)
 Gabriel De Leon (Empire of the Vampire Series)
 Grace Tempest (Vampirates series)
 Hayley Louise Karter (The Protectors: Book 6)
 Hans Croft (Vampire Academy)
 Helen (Thorn: Book 4)
 Hope Mikaelson( pre-tribrid, The Originals, Legacies)
 Horst Cabal (The Fall of the House of Cabal)
 Jack Harkett (Extermination - Vampire Plague series)
 Janine Hathaway (Vampire Academy series)
 Jezebel 'Jez' Redfern (Night World series)
 Kain Morgan (Whitby After Dark)
 Karolina Belikov (Vampire Academy series)
 Klaus Von Reinherz (Blood Blockade BattleFront anime/manga)
 Lillibella Kaaliyah Karter (The Protectors: Book 4, 5 and 6)
 Magiere (Saga of the Noble Dead)
 Mark (Vampire Academy series)
 Mason Ashford (Vampire Academy series)
 Mason Samuel Phillip Karter (The Protectors: Book 6)
 Matayas Von Traum (Garnet Lacey  novels)
 Meredith (Vampire Academy series)
 Mike Sweeney (Pine Deep Trilogy)
 Mikhail Tanner/Tomas Saunders (Vampire Academy series)
 Mr. Quinlan (The Strain)
 Nothing  (Lost Souls)
 Nahuel (Twilight Book 4: Breaking Dawn)
 Olena Belikova (Vampire Academy series)
 Olivier (Vampirates series)
 Paul Belikov (Vampire Academy series)
 Quincy Harker (Dracula: The Undead) – Quincy was revealed as a dhampir, the child of Dracula and Mina Harker, as opposed to being the son of Jonathan Harker, in the sequel to the original novel.
 Sebastian (Gods & Monsters series) 
 Sophie (Vampire Princess series)
 Renesmee Cullen (Twilight Book 4: Breaking Dawn)
 Rayne (BloodRayne)
 Rhoan Jenson (Riley Jenson Guardian)
 Riley Jenson (Riley Jenson Guardian) – Riley is not a regular dhampir as her mother was a werewolf.
 Rosemarie Hathaway (Mazur) (Vampire Academy series)
 Saya (Blood: The Last Vampire)
 Savannah Colbert (Clann series)
 Schuyler Van Alen (Blue Bloods series)
 Sian Lazuro (Guardians' League)
 Solange Drake (The Drake Chronicles)
 Sonya Belikov (Vampire Academy series)
 Sonya Blue (Nancy A. Collins and Sonya Blue)
 Stan Alto (Vampire Academy series)
 Todd (The Dead Game)
 Violet Lee (The Dark Heroine: Dinner with a Vampire)
 Viktoria Belikov (Vampire Academy series)
 Yeva Belikov (Vampire Academy series)
 Zoya Belikov (Vampire Academy series)
 Van (Fang Girl)
 Vandelieu Zakkart (Death Mage series) - His mother is a dark elf.
 Vladimir Tod (The Chronicles of Vladimir Tod)
 Matt Thirst series
 Moegi Akatsuki (strike the blood)
 Reina Akatsuki (strike the blood)
 Dante, Johann, Riche (The Case Study of Vanitas)

Cinema and television

Adrian Ţepeş (Alucard) (Castlevania) 
 Ardak (Split)
 Blade (Blade) – (Technically a dhampir in that his mother was human, although according to all evidence his biological father was also human, his vampirism being 'inherited' when his mother was attacked in the ninth month of her pregnancy)
 Connor (Angel)
 D (Vampire Hunter D)
 Ella Rozen (Split)
 Irwin (half mummy, half dhampir) (The Grim Adventures of Billy & Mandy)
 Dennis (or called Denisovich) – Hybrid son of Mavis (a vampire) and Jonathan Loughran (a human) and grandson of Dracula. (Hotel Transylvania 2)
 Dick (Irwin's dhampir father) (The Grim Adventures of Billy & Mandy)
 Dimitri Belikov (Vampire Academy)
 Drak, Jr. (Drak Pack) (cartoon) – Drak can be considered a dhampir since he is the great-great+ nephew of Count Dracula, and seems to be immune to vampire weaknesses.  Proof of this is the fact that he is outside in the sunlight in most episodes.
 Harry Potter (Wizard People, Dear Reader) – Harry Potter discovers that his biological father is Voldemort, who is a "Dracula."
 James Eastman (Grave of the Vampire) – Leslie Hollander is raped by the vampire Caleb Croft. She gives birth to a son James (last name Eastman after Leslie's boyfriend killed by Croft the same night) he grows to adulthood.  Does not drink blood but eats his steaks raw.  Later when finally confronting Croft, Eastman displays superhuman strength and not only holds his own against Croft, but eventually overcomes him through sheer brute force.
 Kamen Rider Kiva, aka Wataru Kurenai – (Fangire, a creature similar to a vampire) (Kamen Rider Kiva)
 Leah Rosanow (Split)
 Mason Ashford (Vampire Academy)
 Mateo Rodriguez (Imortal) – He is destined to be the chosen one and leader of the vampires.
 Merlock (Flint the Time Detective) – He is described as a descendant of vampires.
 Mr. Quinlan (The Strain)
 Olivia Godfrey (Hemlock Grove) – Olivia is the mother of Roman Godfrey.
 Phaton (Split)
 Rayne (BloodRayne)
 Renesmee Cullen (The Twilight Saga: Breaking Dawn – Part 2) – A gifted vampire-human hybrid, she can transfer her thoughts and memories to others, eat human food and drink human and animal blood, matures at a very fast rate, and has a dim illumination in sunlight opposed to "sparkling" of regular vampires. Renesmee has all the powers as a regular vampire though they are not as powerful or as prominent, She is the daughter of Edward Cullen and Isabella Cullen (née Swan).
 Rita Veder (Vampire in Brooklyn)
 Roman Godfrey (Hemlock Grove) – Roman was born into privilege and friends with the gypsy werewolf Peter Rumancek
 Rosemarie Hathaway (Vampire Academy)
 Tristan Toralba (La Luna Sangre) – She is a vampire hybrid from a human (Luna member) and a female Vampire.
 Vampira (Drak Pack) – Like Drak, Jr., Vampira is often outside in the sun, despite also being a vampiress.

Graphic narratives

 Blade (Tomb of Dracula) – Originally a human who had a special sensitivity to Vampires along with other supernatural and occult phenomena due to being born after his mother was attacked by a vampire. Later made half-vampire in order to bring the character into alignment with the films, which recasts him as a dhampir.
 Bridget Irving Frostheart (The Record of a Fallen Vampire)
 D (Hideyuki Kikuchi's Vampire Hunter D)
 Cody Jones (Paranatural)
 Connor (Angel: After the Fall)
 Ethelbart Takahashi (The Record of a Fallen Vampire)
 Episode (Monogatari (series))
 Felicia Book (American Vampire)
 Giorno Giovanna (JoJo's Bizarre Adventure: Golden Wind)
 Harlan Draka (Dampyr)
 Jean Lamorgue (Le Bal du rat mort)
 Jin Renka (The Record of a Fallen Vampire)
 Kuroboshi (Bloody Kiss)
 The eponymous Miyu of (Vampire Princess Miyu)
 Laetitia (The Record of a Fallen Vampire)
 Lindo Tachibana (Dance with Devils)
Kyoichiro Narugami (鳴神京一郎 Narugami Kyōichirō?) / Merlock Holmes (Flint the Time Detective)
 Nicholas Bane (Journal of the Vampire Hunter: Claws of Darkness)
 Nicholas Gaunt (Dhampire: Stillborn)
 Paifu (Cowa!)
 Plum (No Game No Life)
 Quincy Harker (Dracula: The Undead) – Quincy was revealed as a dhampir, the child of Dracula and Mina Harker, as opposed to being the son of Jonathan Harker, in the sequel to the original novel.
 Rayne (BloodRayne)
 Rykiel (JoJo's Bizarre Adventure: Stone Ocean)
 Saxon Kenchu (Candorville)
 Saya (Blood: The Last Vampire)
 Tessenji Fuuhaku (The Record of a Fallen Vampire)
 Vandalieu (The Death Mage Who Doesn’t Want a Fourth Time)
 Victoria Jane Scott (Dream Scar)
 Yukio Okumura (anime/manga Blue Exorcist) – Yukio and his twin, Rin, are Satan’s kids conceived with a human.
 Yuriya Tachibana (Chibi Vampire)
 Donatello Versus (JoJo's Bizarre Adventure: Stone Ocean)
 Gaspar Vlady (High School DxD)
 Ungalo (JoJo's Bizarre Adventure: Stone Ocean)

Theatre
Bloody Dracul Vampir (Sailor Moon Musicals, specifically Kessen / Transylvania no Mori, its revision, and Last Dracul Saishuu Shou)

Radio
 Una and Peter, "Sunset to Sunrise", CBS Radio Mystery Theatre. Written by Elsbeth Eric. 1974.

Games

 Agronak gro-Malog, aka The Gray Prince (The Elder Scrolls IV: Oblivion)
 Albert (Vampire Night)
 Alucard (Castlevania series) – In the original game series timeline starting with Castlevania III: Dracula's Curse, Alucard (Adrian Fahrenheit Ţepeş) is the son of the vampire Dracula and the human Lisa Ţepeş. In the rebooted Lords of Shadow timeline, Alucard was originally the human Trevor Belmont, son of Gabriel and Maria Belmont, before being resurrected as a vampire by his now-vampiric father Dracula.
 Cloaked Dhampyr (EverQuest)
 D (Vampire Hunter D)
 Dampeer (Heroes of Newerth)
 Donovan Baine / Dee (Darkstalkers)
 Dhampir (Culdcept Saga)
 Dhampir (Dungeons & Dragons)
 Dhampir (Vampire: The Masquerade)
 Drega Zul (Disciples 2)
 Half-Vampire (Dungeons & Dragons)
 Katane (Dungeons & Dragons)
 Kid Dracula (Kid Dracula)
 Michael (Vampire Night)
 Ragna the Bloodedge (BlazBlue: Calamity Trigger)
 Rayne (BloodRayne)
 Saya (Blood: The Last Vampire)
 Simon Belmont (Akumajō Dracula only)
 Sorin Markov, Planeswalker (Magic: The Gathering)
 Svetlana Lupescu (Nocturne)
 Tatsuhiko Shido (Mayonaka no Tantei Night Walker) – Unlike his anime counterpart, where he was turned into a vampire, in the original PC game, his grandfather was a full blood vampire, while the rest of his family is of Japanese descent.

References

Dhampirs
 
Corporeal undead
Fictional hybrid life forms
dhampirs